Islamic Arabic University is a public university in Mohammadpur Thana of Dhaka, Bangladesh. It operates through a number of fazil (bachelor) and kamil (master) level madrasahs  all over Bangladesh instead of a localized campus.

The Islamic Arabic University was authorized by passage in Parliament on 18 September 2013 of the Islamic Arabic University Bill. It supervises all 1,500 fazil (bachelor) and kamil (master) level madrasas in Bangladesh. Initially it was located at the Bangladesh Madrasa Teachers' Training Institute in Gazipur.

References

External links
 

Islamic universities and colleges in Bangladesh
2013 establishments in Bangladesh
Educational institutions established in 2013
Universities and colleges in Dhaka
Islam in Dhaka